The Kentucky Coal Museum is heritage center located in Benham, Kentucky. Its focus is the history of the coal industry in Eastern Kentucky, featuring specific exhibits on the company towns of Benham and neighboring Lynch. It is housed in a former company store that was built by International Harvester in 1923. In June 1990, the Tri-City Chamber of Commerce purchased the building for the future site of the museum. After receiving additional grants from the state of Kentucky, the museum opened in May 1994.

Building 
Built in the 1920s by International Harvester, the museum features four stories of exhibits on the mining history and the coal miner's life. It is a contributing building to the Benham Historic District, which is on the National Register of Historic Places.

In April 2017 the Kentucky Coal Museum added 80 solar panels which cut $8,000 off its annual electricity bill. The Southeastern Kentucky Community and Technical College own the Kentucky Coal Museum and thanks to them they paid for the installation of the solar panels. The solar panels for the museum now generate 60 kilowatts of power at maximum capacity.

Education 
The museum provides education and better insight on the life of hard working coal miners and the pressures they faced while working in dangerous underground mines. One employee Phyllis Sizemore that worked at the museum said "I hope when visitors come to this museum that each are touched emotionally as well as intellectually. I hope they learn something but I hope they find food for thought, I hope their heart is touched as they read and learn about the lives of people and how these people lived and how they raise a family." This museum has welcomed over 6,000 visitors each year.

In early January, recent issues have caught the attention of residents of Benham and Lynch located in Harlan County about surface mining close to these historical towns. This could damage water sources and block the view of the city which helps tourism. This could affect the Kentucky Coal Museum due to a decrease in tourism investments.

Exhibits 
Throughout the museum visitors have access to numerous exhibits and displays on all four floors. Some include the Mock Mine, life of a coal miner and their family, community art mural of Benham, mining tools, Native American & early settler displays, coal camp displays, coal camp schools, coal camps as multicultural places, mine safety exhibits, and the Loretta Lynn Exhibit. Artifacts, antiques, photographs, and machinery make up more than 30 exhibits in the museum. 

One of the most well known tours is the Portal 31 Underground Mine Tour. This tour allows visitors to ride a rail car through a coal mine that include sounds and animated exhibits. Other activities for visitors include having their picture taken outside by the two-ton block of coal and learning about the formation of coal by looking at visuals and fossil displays. 

Below is a list of exhibits on each floor. 

Main Level

 Formation of Coal
 Older Artifacts of Mining
 1920-40 Coal Camp Life
 Hospital Room
 Engineers Office

Second Level 

 Historical Photography
 African American Exhibit
 L & N Display

Third Level 

 Loretta Lynn Exhibit
 Butcher Holler Home Replica
 Native American Exhibit
 Benham Spur Frontier Home Exhibit
 Arts & Media Special Exhibit Area

Fourth Level 

 Mock Mine Exhibit
 Carpenter Shop Exhibit
 Bath House Exhibit
 1960 Tipple Exhibit
 First Aide Display

Awards 
The museum has received the Tri-City Chamber of Commerce History Award, Harlan County People's Choice Award, and The American Council of Engineering Companies (ACEC) of Kentucky's Grand Conceptor Award, and the Top 3 Award by ACEC for excellence in engineering on the national level. It has also been featured in 55 state and national publications.

See also

Coal Miners' Museum
David A. Zegeer Coal-Railroad Museum

References

External links
Kentucky Coal Museum & Portal 31
Portal 31
Kingdom Come State Park

Museums in Harlan County, Kentucky
History museums in Kentucky
Mining museums in Kentucky
Buildings and structures completed in 1923
Museums established in 1994
Coal museums in the United States
1994 establishments in Kentucky
Company stores in the United States
Navistar International
Historic district contributing properties in Kentucky
Commercial buildings completed in 1923
Mining in Kentucky